
Łask County is a unit of territorial administration and local government (powiat) in Łódź Voivodeship, central Poland. It came into being on January 1, 1999, as a result of the Polish local government reforms passed in 1998.

As of 2006 its total population is 50,874, out of which the population of Łask is 18,684 and the rural population is 32,190.

Neighbouring counties
Łask County is bordered by Poddębice County to the north, Pabianice County to the east, Bełchatów County to the south-east, Wieluń County to the south-west, and Sieradz County and Zduńska Wola County to the west.

Administrative division
The county is subdivided into five gminas (one urban-rural and four rural). These are listed in the following table, in descending order of population.

References
Polish official population figures 2006

 
Land counties of Łódź Voivodeship